Theophilus Hastings, 9th Earl of Huntingdon (12 November 1696 – 13 October 1746) was the son of Theophilus Hastings, 7th Earl of Huntingdon and Mary Frances Fowler.

Hastings married Lady Selina Shirley, daughter of Washington Shirley, 2nd Earl Ferrers and Mary Levinge, on 3 June 1728. The couple lived at Donington Park. He fathered seven legitimate children including Francis Hastings, 10th Earl of Huntingdon 13 March 1729 – 2 October 1789), Elizabeth Rawdon, Countess of Moira (1731–1808) and Selina (born 3 December 1737).

He had an illegitimate son, Sir George Hastings (1733–1783).  

There is a monument to him in St Helen's Church, Ashby-de-la-Zouch.

Notes

1696 births
1746 deaths
Theophilus Hastings, 09th Earl of Huntingdon
9
Barons Hastings
Barons Botreaux
Barons Hungerford